Monica Hesse is a national bestselling author from Normal, Illinois. She is the recipient of the Edgar Award for Best Young Adult Mystery for her book Girl in the Blue Coat, and the Society for Feature Journalism's Narrative Storytelling award.

She is a feature writer for The Washington Post where in 2018 she was appointed first ever gender columnist.

Works
 2016 – Girl in the Blue Coat
 2017 –  American Fire: Love, Arson, and Life in a Vanishing Land
 2018 –  The War Outside 
 2020 -  They Went Left

References

External links

Living people
Edgar Award winners
People from Normal, Illinois
Year of birth missing (living people)
American mystery novelists
American columnists
The Washington Post people
American women columnists
21st-century American novelists
21st-century American journalists
21st-century American women writers
Novelists from Illinois
Journalists from Illinois
American young adult novelists
Women writers of young adult literature